Nathan "Nate" Sanderson (born June 3, 1985 in Orangeville, ON) is a Canadian lacrosse player. Sanderson was drafted by the Colorado Mammoth 26th overall in the 2007 National Lacrosse League Entry Draft. He played for the Toronto Rock of the National Lacrosse League during the 2008 NLL season and signed with the Calgary Roughnecks for the 2009 NLL season. Sanderson is one of a number of Sandersons in the NLL, including his brother Phil and his cousin Josh.

Statistics

NLL
Reference:

References

1985 births
Canadian lacrosse players
Living people
Lacrosse people from Ontario
People from Orangeville, Ontario
Toronto Rock players